Poland competed at the 1980 Summer Paralympics in Arnhem, Netherlands. 80 competitors from Poland won 177 medals including 75 gold, 50 silver and 52 bronze and finished 2nd in the medal table.

See also 
 Poland at the Paralympics
 Poland at the 1980 Summer Olympics

References 

Poland at the Paralympics
1980 in Polish sport
Nations at the 1980 Summer Paralympics